Somatina plynusaria is a moth of the  family Geometridae. It is found in northern India, China and Taiwan.

References

Moths described in 1863
Scopulini